The Night of the Phoenix is the sixth of Nelson DeMille's novels featuring NYPD Sergeant Joe Ryker. It was first published in 1975 with the protagonist originally as Joe Keller. Then republished in 1989 with the author listed as Jack Cannon.

References

American thriller novels
1975 American novels
Novels by Nelson DeMille